Syro-Platoshino is a rural locality (a village) in Platoshinskoye Rural Settlement, Permsky District, Perm Krai, Russia. The population was 13 as of 2010. There is 1 street.

Geography 
Syro-Platoshino is located 52 km south of Perm (the district's administrative centre) by road. Kukushtan is the nearest rural locality.

References 

Rural localities in Permsky District